ISA Media Development is a French media company, which engages in radio publishing and is created in January 2008. ISA Media Development owns the following French local radio stations : Radio ISA, Radio No1 and N'Radio, of which Radio ISA and Radio No1 are member of the GIE of Les Indés Radios.

ISA stands for the three departments where the Radio ISA network is broadcasting : Isère, Savoie and Ain.

External links
  Radio ISA's website
  ISA Media Development at Société.com

References

Radio broadcasting companies of France
Companies based in Auvergne-Rhône-Alpes
French companies established in 2008
Mass media companies established in 2008